Solasulfone is an antileprotic drug developed from the parent compound sulphetrone. It was first described and evaluated in the 1930s and 1940s as an antibacterial agent for the treatment of tuberculosis and various other infections, and later found to be effective in the treatment of leprosy.

References 

Antileprotic drugs
Benzosulfones
Sulfonates
Anilines